Siemons is a Dutch patronymic surname, where Siemon is an archaic spelling of Simon. Notable people with the surname include:

Amy Siemons (born 1985), Dutch wheelchair racer
Jan Siemons (born 1964), Dutch cyclist

Dutch-language surnames
Patronymic surnames
Surnames from given names